Vanguard is a daily newspaper published by Vanguard Media, based in Lagos, Nigeria. Vanguard Media was established in 1984 by veteran journalist Sam Amuka-Pemu with three friends.
The paper has an online edition. It is one of the few newspapers in Nigeria considered independent from political control, the others being This Day, The Punch, The Sun and The Guardian.

In June 1990, the paper was briefly suspended by Col. Raji Rasaki, Military Governor of Lagos State.

In December 2008, the US-based Pointblanknews.com published a story that alleged the wife of the publisher of Vanguard Newspapers was involved in a ritual killing. The Vanguard took the reporter to court, claiming he was attempting extortion. 
In December 2009,  a Niger Delta peace activist commended Vanguard Newspaper for its reporting on the government's intentions, which he said helped persuade the militants to accept amnesty.

References

Newspapers published in Lagos
Publications established in 1983
1983 establishments in Nigeria
Companies based in Lagos
Daily newspapers published in Nigeria